Latin Extended-E is a Unicode block containing Latin script characters used in German dialectology (Teuthonista),, Anthropos alphabet, Sakha and Americanist usage.

  is a superscript version of 
  is a superscript version of 
  is a superscript version of 
  is a superscript version of

History
The following Unicode-related documents record the purpose and process of defining specific characters in the Latin Extended-E block:

See also 
Greek alphabet in Unicode

References 

Latin-script Unicode blocks
Computer-related introductions in 2014
Unicode blocks